Barentu is a town in north-western Eritrea, lying south of Agordat, and is the capital of Gash-Barka Region. The town is integrated with different types of tribes: Kunama, Nara, Tigre and Tigrinya being the most dominant.

History
It was mainly inhabited by the Nilotic Kunama people and Nara people in the past. The Nara people leader Shekaray Agaba was the first to build the town Umba Arenku which it means the white water. It is located in the Gash-Barka Zone of Eritrea. Barentu is the  largest town in the Gash-Barka Zone in Eritrea, lying west of Asmara. It is the capital of the Gash-Barka and home of the Nara and Kunama Ethnic groups.

The town has typically been a center of mining and agricultural activities for the area. During the Eritrean War of Independence the town was besieged. As part of the Eritrean-Ethiopian War of 1998-2000, the then flourishing town suffered major damage but has since undergone reconstruction. Thus it now attracts settlers from all parts of the country especially from the Gash area and the Eritrean highlands. Owing to this factor the town has expanded rapidly in the last decade. This rapid expansion is also partly attributed to the Eritrean returnees from Sudan who established their home in the town after years of migration spent in Sudan.

Geography

Overview
Barentu is the administrative center of Barentu Subregion; has basic electricity services, a hospital and a clinic. The town consists of 3 administrative quarters or zobas (as they are called in tigrigna) namely zoba Fthi [ፍትሒ], Selam [ሰላም] and Biara [ቢያራ].

Nearby towns and villages include Tauda, Alegada, Dedda, Augana, Cona and Daghilo, Mogolo, Kofa Arenku, Arada Tarkina and Lemesa.

Climate
Its climate is hot semi-arid (Köppen: BSh), warm during summer and cold during winter. Its climate is favorable for different types of crops, fruits, vegetables and a large variety of animals flourish in the region.

Economy
It is one of the fastest-growing cities in the country. It acts as a hub for the surrounding agricultural areas, as a center for trade and exchange of commodities owing to its location in the center of the Gash Barka region.

The town is not only growing fast but it is also developing with the scale, and it have been able to provide basic services, such transport, education, health facilities and all that coupled with a fine weather. The town gets very active on the weekly market days which host farmers, traders and livestock herders who all come to the town on Thursday and Saturday from surrounding villages to sell their produce and in return purchase commodities and goods to take back home. Products which come from the villages include crops such as sorghum, millet and sesame. Live stocks such as cows, camels, sheep and goats fill the market with active sense of exchange especially when it is near the holidays.

Culture
Barentu is inhabited by the Kunama and the Nara peoples. Religiously, the city has adherents of the Eritrean Orthodox Tewahedo Church, the Eritrean Catholic Church, and Islam, as well as practitioners of the indigenous Kunama and Nara traditional beliefs.

Traditional Kunama religion is monotheistic, with worship of the goddess Anna. The name Anna appears in many phrases of the Kunama language, such as "Annam koske" ("God exists, sees and judges"), "Anna laga" (lit. "God’s world", i.e., "the universe belongs to God"), and "Anna hedabu" ("God willing").

Education
Education is supplied by a number of elementary and junior high schools, and one high school. Schools teach in Kunama, Nara, Modern Standard Arabic, Tigrinya, and English.

Transport
Transport wise Barentu is a hub that connects different parts of the country and it has asphalt roads connecting it with Asmara, Keren, Tessenei, Haikota and Agordat, dirt roads connect with smaller towns like Tokombia, and Shambuqo. Due to its location the town is busy with travellers from all over the region. Locally transport is supplied with taxis and buses which connect different parts of the town, but it seems the locals prefer to walk.

References

External links 
 

Gash-Barka Region
Regional capitals in Eritrea
Populated places in Eritrea